Lithoglyphidae is a family of small freshwater snails with gills and an operculum, aquatic gastropod mollusks.

This family is in the superfamily Truncatelloidea and in the clade Littorinimorpha (according to the taxonomy of the Gastropoda by Bouchet & Rocroi, 2005).

Taxonomy
Taylor (1966), Ponder & Warén (1988) and Kabat & Hershler (1993) considered this taxon as a subfamily Lithoglyphinae within Hydrobiidae. Radoman (1983) considered Lithoglyphidae as a separate family. Bernasconi (1992) considered this taxon as a tribe Lithoglyphini in the Hydrobiinae within Hydrobiidae.

2005 taxonomy
The family Lithoglyphidae consists of 2 subfamilies according to the taxonomy of the Gastropoda by Bouchet & Rocroi, 2005. It follows Wilke et al. (2001), Hausdorf et al. (2003) and includes Lepyriidae according to Thompson (1984).
 subfamily Lithoglyphinae Tryon, 1866 - synonyms: Fluminicolinae Clessin, 1880; Lepyriidae Pilsbry & Olsson, 1951
 subfamily Benedictiinae Clessin, 1880

Genera
Subfamily Benedictiinae
Benedictia W. Dybowski, 1875
Benedictia (Baicalocochlea) Lindholm, 1927
Benedictia (Benedictia) W. Dybowski, 1875
Kobeltocochlea Lindholm, 1909
Pseudobenedictia Sitnikova, 1987
Yaroslawiella Sitnikova, 2001
Subfamily Lithoglyphinae
Antrorbis Hershler & Thompson, 1990
Clappia Walker, 1909
Dabriana Radoman, 1974
Fluminicola Stimpson, 1865, synonymised with:
Fluminicola (Gillia) Stimpson, 1865
Heathilla Hannibal, 1912
Gillia Stimpson, 1865
Holsingeria Hershler, 1989
Lepyrium Dall, 1896
Lithoglyphus C. Pfeiffer, 1828
Phreatodrobia Hershler & Longley, 1986
Pristinicola Hershler, Frest, Johannes, Bowler & F. G. Thompson, 1994
Pterides Pilsbry, 1909
Somatogyrus Gill, 1863
Taylorconcha Hershler, Frest, Johannes, Bowler & F. G. Thompson, 1994

References

External links

 
Gastropod families